The Banifing River is a river in western Africa. It flows through Mali and a small part of Burkina Faso, forming part of the international boundary between the two countries. It is a tributary of the Bani River.

References 

Rivers of Mali
Rivers of Burkina Faso
International rivers of Africa
Burkina Faso–Mali border